Anett Kontaveit defeated Maria Sakkari in the final, 5–7, 7–6(7–4), 7–5 to win the singles title at the 2022 St. Petersburg Ladies' Trophy. Kontaveit's victory in the final was her 20th consecutive match win on indoor hard courts, dating back to the 2021 Ostrava Open; this is the longest such streak since Justine Henin won 22 matches on indoor courts between October 2007 and May 2010.

Daria Kasatkina was the defending champion, but withdrew before the tournament began.

Seeds

Draw

Finals

Top half

Bottom half

Qualifying

Seeds

Qualifiers

Lucky loser

Qualifying draw

First qualifier

Second qualifier

Third qualifier

Fourth qualifier

References

External links 
 Main draw
 Qualifying draw

2022 WTA Tour
2022 St. Petersburg Ladies' Trophy - 1